The Smoky Hill Trail was an American trail across the central Great Plains of North America in use from 1855 to 1870. Established in what was then Kansas Territory, it extended west from Atchison, Kansas on the Kansas River and Smoky Hill River to Denver, spanning the length of what is today Kansas and the eastern portion of Colorado. The trail was named after the Smoky Hill River whose course it paralleled for much of its length. Used by prospectors as the most direct route west to the Colorado gold fields during the Pike's Peak Gold Rush, it later served as a path westward for American settlers before being gradually superseded by the Kansas Pacific Railway.

Gallery

References

Historic trails and roads in Colorado
Historic trails and roads in Kansas